Yaparsaz (Yaparhaź) is a rural locality (a village) in Matrayevsky Selsoviet, Zilairsky District, Bashkortostan, Russia. The population was 236 as of 2010. There are 5 streets.

Geography 
Yaparsaz is located 61 km east of Zilair (the district's administrative centre) by road. Matrayevo is the nearest rural locality.

References 

Rural localities in Zilairsky District